Rosketti or rosketi are traditional Chamorro cornstarch cookies.

Ingredients
The primary ingredient for rosketti is typically corn starch. Other ingredients include flour, sugar, butter or shortening, milk or cream, eggs, baking powder, and vanilla.  Some rosketti recipes result in a very thick, hard-to-swallow cookie, while others yield a crumbly, melt-in-your-mouth cookie.  The taste and texture of a rosketti recipe, however, produces a very distinct end result, due primarily to the use of cornstarch.

Making
Rosketti dough is historically rolled into a log the size and length of a pencil.  The dough is either formed into a coil, or into a pretzel.  Some shape the dough into a ball then flatten the dough with the tines of a fork.  The cookies are baked on a greased cookie sheet till moderately or lightly browned.

Sources
 
  (Guam cookbook)
  (Guam cookbook)
 

Chamorro cuisine
Guamanian desserts
Cookies